is a Japanese short track speed skater. She competed at the 2002 Winter Olympics and the 2006 Winter Olympics.

References

1980 births
Living people
Japanese female short track speed skaters
Olympic short track speed skaters of Japan
Short track speed skaters at the 2002 Winter Olympics
Short track speed skaters at the 2006 Winter Olympics
Sportspeople from Osaka Prefecture
Asian Games medalists in short track speed skating
Short track speed skaters at the 1999 Asian Winter Games
Short track speed skaters at the 2003 Asian Winter Games
Short track speed skaters at the 2007 Asian Winter Games
Medalists at the 1999 Asian Winter Games
Medalists at the 2003 Asian Winter Games
Medalists at the 2007 Asian Winter Games
Asian Games silver medalists for Japan
Asian Games bronze medalists for Japan
21st-century Japanese women